Hoàng Danh Ngọc (born 3 April 1990) is a Vietnamese former professional footballer who plays as a left winger. He is the twin brother of Hoàng Nhật Nam.

References

External links
 

1990 births
Living people
Vietnamese footballers
Association football wingers
Long An FC players
V.League 1 players